The Verbandsliga Südwest is a German amateur football division administered by the Southwest German Football Association, one of the 21 German state football associations. Being the top flight of the Southwestern state association, the Verbandsliga is a level 6 division of the German football league system.

Overview
The Amateurliga Südwest was formed in 1952 in the southern half of the state of Rhineland-Palatinate. Before its inception, three separate leagues operated in the area as the highest level of play. The league was a feeder league to the 2. Oberliga Südwest. From 1952 until the establishment of the Oberliga Südwest in 1978, it was the third tier of the football league system.

The winner of the Amateurliga Südwest was not automatically promoted to its superior league but rather had to take part in a promotion play-off. The champion would have to compete with the winners of the Amateurligen Saarland and Rheinland.

Until 1933, the region covered by the Southwest FA was politically part of two other German states during the Weimar Republic era. The south, the Palatinate (Pfalz) region, was part of Bavaria and the north, the Rhenish Hesse (Rheinhessen) region, was part of Hesse. This explains the seemingly odd fact that there are two clubs in the Südwest region named "Bavaria", FC Bavaria Wörth and FC Bavaria Ebernburg. From 1933 to 1945, most of the region was part of the Gau Saar-Palatinate. After the war, these regions were incorporated into the new state of Rhineland-Palatinate. The separation of these areas from their original states resulted from the outcome of the Second World War when they became part of the French occupation zone, while Hessen and Bavaria were in the US zone.

The league was established in 1952 with sixteen teams, the winner gaining promotion to the 2nd Oberliga Südwest. The founder members were:

BSC Oppau
VfR Friesenheim
FSV Schifferstadt
Phönix Bellheim
SV Alsenborn
TuS Hochspeyer
SpVgg Idar
Palatia Böhl
SC Oberstein 08
ESC West-Kaiserslautern
SpVgg Ingelheim
SV Gonsenheim
Fontana Finthen
FC Sobernheim
SG Waldfischbach
SV Mundenheim

With the introduction of the Bundesliga in 1963 the Amateurliga was placed below the new Regionalliga Südwest but still retained its third-tier status. It continued to do so after the introduction of the 2nd Bundesliga Süd in 1974.

The 1. FC Kaiserslautern II holds the record for years in the Amateurliga, having spent 21 continuous seasons in it from 1957 to 1978.

The Amateurliga Südwest was renamed in 1978, now becoming the Verbandsliga Südwest. At the same time as this, the Oberliga Südwest was reformed, now as the third tier of the league system. The top five teams out of the Amateurliga went to the new Oberliga while the teams from place 6 to 16 found themselves in the Verbandsliga. The bottom four teams were relegated. The new Verbandsliga was now the fourth tier of the league system.

The winner of the Verbandsliga Südwest, like the winners of the Saarlandliga and Rheinlandliga gains direct promotion to the Oberliga Rheinland-Pfalz/Saar, formerly the Oberliga Südwest. The runners-up will only get a chance for promotion when there is additional spots to fill in the Oberliga, like 1994 when the Regionalligen were introduced and Hassia Bingen was promoted.

There is room for misunderstanding in the existence of an Oberliga and a Verbandsliga Südwest. While the Oberliga covers the two states of Saarland and Rhineland-Palatinate, the Verbandsliga covers only the southern half of Rhineland-Palatinate.

Feeder Leagues to the Verbandsliga Südwest

Landesliga Südwest-Ost
Landesliga Südwest-West

League champions
The league champions:

bold denotes club gained promotion.
In 1960, FSV Schifferstadt was promoted as runners-up since Kaiserslautern's reserve team was ineligible for promotion. For the same reason, FV Speyer was promoted in 1968.
In 1994 and 2018, the runner-up Hassia Bingen was also promoted.
In 2016 and 2019, the runners-up SV Morlautern and FV Dudenhofen were promoted respectively after play-offs.

References

Sources
 Deutschlands Fußball in Zahlen,  An annual publication with tables and results from the Bundesliga to Verbandsliga/Landesliga, publisher: DSFS
 Kicker Almanach,  The yearbook on German football from Bundesliga to Oberliga, since 1937, published by Kicker Sports Magazine
 Süddeutschlands Fußballgeschichte in Tabellenform 1897-1988  History of Southern German football in tables, publisher & author: Ludolf Hyll
 Die Deutsche Liga-Chronik 1945-2005  History of German football from 1945 to 2005 in tables, publisher: DSFS, published: 2006

External links 
 Das deutsche Fussball Archiv  Historic German league tables

Sud
Football competitions in Rhineland-Palatinate
1952 establishments in West Germany
Sports leagues established in 1952